Brendan Chardonnet (born 22 December 1994) is a French professional footballer who plays as a defender for Stade Brestois 29.

Career
Chardonnet made his professional debut with Brest in a Ligue 1 3–1 defeat against Paris Saint-Germain in May 2013, coming in the pitch for the last half-hour of the game.

Career statistics

References

External links

1994 births
Living people
People from Saint-Renan
Sportspeople from Finistère
French footballers
Association football defenders
Ligue 1 players
Ligue 2 players
Championnat National players
Stade Brestois 29 players
SAS Épinal players
Footballers from Brittany